John A. Goodlett was an American politician. He served as the Mayor of Nashville, Tennessee from 1846 to 1847.

Biography
His father was Dr. Adam Gibb Goodlett, a physician, surgeon and planter, and his mother, Charlotte Phanuel Campbell. His siblings were Michael C. Goodlett, George Washington Goodlett, James Goodlett and William Goodlett. His brother Michael was the husband of Caroline Meriwether Goodlett, who founded the United Daughters of the Confederacy.

He served as Mayor of Nashville from 1846 to 1847.

References

American people of Scottish descent
Mayors of Nashville, Tennessee
19th-century American politicians
Goodlett family